Maokong Station is the terminal station of the Maokong Gondola of the Taipei Rapid Transit System, located in Wenshan District, Taipei, Taiwan. It provides access to the town of Maokong, which the station is named after.

Railway stations opened in 2007
Maokong Gondola stations